Ralton Ashton "Rowley" Flynne (12 January 1913 – 20 August 2003) was an Australian rules footballer who played with South Melbourne and Footscray in the Victorian Football League (VFL).

Fynne played his early football for the Church of Christ in Windsor. He made four league appearances for South Melbourne in the 1935 VFL season. The club made the grand final that season, but Flynne didn't take part in the finals series. He played for Sunshine in 1936 and was a member of their premiership team, before returning to the VFL the following year, with Footscray.

References

1913 births
Australian rules footballers from Victoria (Australia)
Sydney Swans players
Western Bulldogs players
2003 deaths